Rag Tale is a 2005 British comedy film directed by Mary McGuckian. It received mainly negative reviews.

Cast 
 Rupert Graves - Editor - The Rag, Eddy Somerset Taylor
 Jennifer Jason Leigh - Deputy Editor - The Rag, Mary Josephine (MJ) Morton
 Lucy Davis - Editor's PA - The Rag, Debbs
 John Sessions - Political Editor - The Rag, Felix Miles Sty
 Bill Paterson - News Editor - The Rag, Tulloch (Lucky) Lloyd
 Sara Stockbridge - Fashion Editor - The Rag, Sally May Ponsonby
 Cal MacAninch - Sports Editor - The Rag, Paul (Mac) MacAvoy
 David Hayman - Picture Editor - The Rag, Geoff (P3) Randal
 Simon Callow - Features Editor - The Rag, Cormac (Fat Boy) Rourke
 Malcolm McDowell - Chairman - Global Media Inc, Richard (The Chief) Morton
 Kerry Fox - Editor - The Press, Peach James Taylor
 Ian Hart - Photographer, Morph

References

External links 

2005 comedy films
2005 films
British comedy films
2000s English-language films
2000s British films